The Li Auto L8 is a luxury mid-size crossover SUV by Chinese automobile manufacturer Li Xiang, and it is also the replacement for the Li Xiang One.

History 
After three years of presence on the Chinese market, the Li Auto One has been discontinued in October 2022 to make way for its replacement, the Li Auto L8, causing controversy and backlash in social media amidst sudden change of narrative. Earlier in 2022, company claimed both SUVs will be sold simultaneously.

The Li Auto L8 was presented in September 2022 during the Li Auto online product launch event. The first vehicles were delivered in China from late 2022.

The Li Auto L8 is expected to share most of the specs with the next model of the Li Auto lineup, the slightly smaller midsize 5-seater L7. Specs of the Li Auto L7 are exactly the same, except for dimensions. The smaller L7 crossover SUV will also be coming in two versions called Pro and Max. Pricing starts at CNY 339,800 ($47,700) and CNY 379,800 ($53,300), respectively.

Specifications 

The vehicle can be described as a range extended vehicle or as a PHEV. It has two electric motors: a  motor in the front and a  motor in the rear. It is also equipped with a front-mounted 1.5-litre turbocharged 4-cylinder petrol engine with a  petrol tank capacity. The petrol engine is a range extender for the electric motors; it does not directly power the wheels.

Charging to 80% takes 30 minutes with a fast charger. A full charge at 200V takes 6.5 hours.

It is an SUV, available with six seats in three rows. The interior has several screens sharing the same HUD and mini LED touchscreen in the steering wheel as the Li Auto L9, an additional dual 3K 15.7-inch central touchscreens, and the infotainment system runs on Android Auto, powered by a dual of Qualcomm Snapdragon 8155 CPU processor with 24GB of RAM and 256GB of internal storage for the L8 Max and a single 8155 CPU processor with 12GB of RAM and 128GB of internal storage for the L8 Pro.

The L8 Max comes with the same AD MAX found in the Li L9, which means that the L8 Max is equipped with the same dual Nvidia Orin-X chips with 508TOPS. The L8 Max also uses the same sensor array consisting of a roof-mounted Hesai lidar, six 8MP cameras, two 5MP cameras, 12 ultrasonic radars, and a milliwave radar. The Li Xiang L8 Pro uses a system named AD Pro, which is a vision-only system without the roof-mounted lidar. The system uses a Horizon Robotics Journey 5 chip with 128 TOPS and sensor array consists of an 8MP front camera and five 2MP peripheral cameras along with four 2MP surround view cameras, 12 ultrasonic radars, and a milliwave radar. will be equipped with a Level 2 Autonomous Driving system.

The combination of a small internal combustion engine with a battery that is noticeably larger than in most PHEVs resembles the BMW i3 REx.

Price

The Li Auto L8 Max is priced just under ¥400,000, around $55,200. The Li Auto L8 Pro costs around $49,700 RMB

References

Cars of China
All-wheel-drive vehicles
Cars introduced in 2022
Mid-size sport utility vehicles
Hybrid electric cars
Plug-in hybrid vehicles